Hunseid's Cabinet governed Norway from 14 March 1932 to 3 March 1933. The Agrarian Party cabinet was led by Prime Minister Jens Hundseid. It had the following composition:

Cabinet members

References

Notes

Hundseid
Hundseid
1932 establishments in Norway
1933 disestablishments in Norway
Cabinets established in 1932
Cabinets disestablished in 1933